The 2016 Hardee's Pro Classic was a professional tennis tournament played on outdoor clay courts. It was the sixteenth edition of the tournament and part of the 2016 ITF Women's Circuit, offering a total of $50,000 in prize money. It took place in Dothan, Alabama, United States, on 18–24 April 2016.

Singles main draw entrants

Seeds 

 1 Rankings as of 11 April 2016.

Other entrants 
The following players received wildcards into the singles main draw:
  Lauren Albanese
  Sofia Kenin
  Claire Liu
  Alexandra Sanford

The following players received entry from the qualifying draw:
  Varvara Flink
  Olga Ianchuk
  Raveena Kingsley
  Taylor Townsend

The following player received entry by a lucky loser:
  Olivia Rogowska

The following player received entry by a protected ranking:
  Ulrikke Eikeri

Champions

Singles

 Rebecca Peterson def.  Taylor Townsend, 6–4, 6–2

Doubles

 Asia Muhammad /  Taylor Townsend def.  Caitlin Whoriskey /  Keri Wong, 6–0, 6–1

External links 
 2016 Hardee's Pro Classic at ITFtennis.com
 Official website

2016 ITF Women's Circuit
Hardees
2016 in sports in Alabama
Hardee's Pro Classic